The Gutzlaff Signal Tower, also known as the Bund Weather Tower or the Bund Signal Tower (外滩信号台), is a major landmark in Shanghai's Bund. It is a 36.8m tall (50m focal height) signal station designed and built by Spanish innovator and industrialist Modesto Marti de Sola, thrgough his company Shanghai Reinforced Concrete Company Co. in the year 1907. It was built in Art Deco style, originally intended to provide weather information to ships on the Huangpu River, in particular typhoon warnings.

History
A signal station was first built in the Bund area by the French in 1865, soon after the cession of Shanghai's foreign concession. It was rebuilt in 1884, at the time of the establishment of the Zikawei Observatory by French Jesuits. The current structure was built in 1907, and named after Karl Gützlaff. The tower signaled weather reports five times a day, and gave emergency flag signals in case of typhoon or sudden inclement weather. Its operation was discontinued in 1956.

The tower was moved 23 m to its current location in 1993, and was reconstructed in 1999. Currently, the ground floor houses a museum of history of the Bund, and the first floor a cafe.

External links
 

Buildings and structures in Shanghai
Water transport infrastructure
The Bund
Art Deco architecture